Guez can mean:

People
 Ben Guez (born 1987), American baseball outfielder in the Detroit Tigers organization
 David Guez (born 1982), French tennis player
 Dor Guez, Israeli photography and video artist
 Jean-Louis Guez de Balzac (1597–1654), French author
 Mateo Guez, French director, writer, photographer, and producer. Resides in Canada.
 Mathilda Guez (1918–90), Israeli politician who served as a member of the Knesset for Rafi

Other uses 

 Looking for Moshe Guez, 2011 Israeli documentary film